Kervin Godon (born 11 April 1981) is a Mauritian international footballer who plays as a midfielder for Saint-Denis FC in the Réunion Premier League and for the Mauritius national football team.

References

1981 births
Living people
Mauritian footballers
Mauritius international footballers
Mauritian expatriate footballers
Mauritian expatriate sportspeople in Réunion
Mauritian Premier League players
AS Port-Louis 2000 players
Association football midfielders